Charaxes teissieri is a butterfly in the family Nymphalidae. It is found in the Brazzaville region of the Republic of the Congo.

References

Charaxes teissieri? images at Consortium for the Barcode of Life

Butterflies described in 1984
teissieri
Endemic fauna of the Republic of the Congo
Butterflies of Africa